Rudraraju Padmaraju is an Indian politician and an MLC in Andhra Pradesh. He belongs to Telugu Desam Party. He hails from East Godavari district.

References

Telugu politicians
Indian National Congress politicians from Andhra Pradesh
Living people
Members of the Andhra Pradesh Legislative Council
People from East Godavari district
Year of birth missing (living people)